Interstate 105 may refer to either any of three unconnected Interstate Highways in the United States, each of which is or was related to Interstate 5:

 Interstate 105 (California), a spur of Interstate 5 in Los Angeles County, California
 Interstate 105 (California 1964–1968), a former part of U.S. Route 101 in downtown Los Angeles, California
 Interstate 105 (Oregon), a spur of Interstate 5 in Eugene, Oregon

05-1
1